Yarwana (born Ye Lin Naung on 25 September 1992) is a Burmese singer who rose to fame with his album Answer. His hit song "Kyal Kalay" was the longest leading No 2 in Myanmar Top Chart on JOOX.

Career
Yarwana began his music career in 2015, as a singer in the underground music.  He released his debut album One Percent on 16 September 2018. His second album MIXED was released in 2019. On 20 September 2020, he released a single song with featured artists, Yaw Yazt, called "Tine Ser" which peaked at number one on Myanmar Top Chart on Joox. He released his third album Answer on 1 March 2020 which was officially distributed to all parts of Myanmar. The album was a success, gaining him a large following, and planted him as a popular singer in the Burmese music scene. He held an album release show in Yangon where a crowd of thousands of fans gathered. 

He released a single called "Kyal Kalay" on 20 March 2020 which peaked at number one on Myanmar Top Chart on Joox, and was listed the longest leading No 2 in Myanmar Top Chart. Yarwana is named in Joox's "Top Artists".

Discography

Albums

One Percent (2018)
MIXED (2019)
Answer (2020)

Singles

"Lan Ma Kwel Like Par Nae" (လမ်းမခွဲလိုက်ပါနဲ့) (2018)
"Visitor" (ဧည့်သည်) (2019)
"Hna Ko Tu" (နှစ်ကိုယ်တူ) (2019)
 "Tine Ser" (တိုင်စာ) (2019)
"Mone" (မုန်း) (2019)
"Kyal Kalay" (ကြယ်ကလေး) (2020)
"The Most Beautiful Icon" (အလှဆုံးဣတ္ထိယ) (2020)
"Myat Yay" (မျက်ရည်) (2020)

Notes

References

External links

1992 births
Living people
21st-century Burmese male singers
Burmese singer-songwriters
People from Yangon